Niki and Flo is a 2003 Romanian drama film directed by Lucian Pintilie.

Cast 
 Victor Rebengiuc - Niki Ardelean
 Răzvan Vasilescu - Florian (Flo) Tufaru
 Coca Bloos - Poucha Ardelean
 Mihaela Caracas - Doina Tufaru
 Șerban Pavlu - Eugen Tufaru
 Dorina Chiriac - Angela Tufaru
 Marius Galea - Mihai Ardelean
 Andreea Bibiri - Irina Ardelean
  - Irina's father
 Aristita Diamandi - Irina's mother
  - Irina's brother
 Raluca Penu - Irina's sister

References

External links 

2003 drama films
2003 films
Romanian drama films